Jane Hall may refer to:

People
Jane Hall (journalist), former Fox News Channel pundit
Jane Hall (actress) (born 1971), Australian actress
Jane Hamilton Hall (1915-1981) American physicist
Jane Hall (rower) (born 1973), British rower
Jane Hall (author), Canadian author of The Red Wall: A Woman in the RCMP

TV and film
Jane Hall (TV series), British television drama 

Hall, Jane